A by-election was held for the Australian House of Representatives seat of Cunningham on 25 October 1977. It was triggered by the death of former Whitlam Government minister and Labor MP Rex Connor.

The by-election was won by Labor candidate Stewart West.

Results

Rex Connor died.

References

1977 elections in Australia
New South Wales federal by-elections
October 1977 events in Australia